Amir Bekandeh (also Romanized as Amīr Bekandeh; also known as Amīr Kandeh, Amir-Kende, and Amit Kendeh) is a village in Hajji Bekandeh-ye Koshk-e Bijar Rural District, Khoshk-e Bijar District, Rasht County, Gilan Province, Iran. At the 2006 census, its population was 384, in 114 families.

References 

Populated places in Rasht County